Empanda ornata is a species of jumping spiders (family Salticidae). It is the only species in the genus Empanda, and is only found in Guatemala.

Name 
The genus name is derived from the Roman goddess Empanda. The species name is Latin for "adorned".

References 

Salticidae
Spiders of Central America
Spiders described in 1885